Vasily Denisov (born 1951) is a Russian mathematician, Dr.Sc., Professor, a professor at the Faculty of Computer Science at the Moscow State University.

He graduated from the faculty MSU CMC (1976).

He defended the thesis "On the behavior for large values of the time of solutions of parabolic equations" for the degree of Doctor of Physical and Mathematical Sciences (2011).

He is the author of four books and more than 90 scientific articles.

Area of scientific interests: stabilization of solutions of the Cauchy problem and boundary value problems for parabolic equations; qualitative theory of partial differential equations.

References

Bibliography

External links
 
 
 

Russian computer scientists
Russian mathematicians
Living people
Academic staff of Moscow State University
1951 births
Moscow State University alumni